Pyrrhoderma is a genus of fungi in the family Hymenochaetaceae. It contains two species found in Japan.

References

External links

	

Hymenochaetaceae
Agaricomycetes genera